Members of the Council of Ministers of Niger as of 29 June 2009 include:

Prime Minister: Brigi Rafini
Minister of State for the Interior, Public Safety and Decentralization: Albadé Abouba
Minister of Foreign Affairs, Cooperation and African Integration : Aichatou Mindaoudou
Minister of Economy and Finance: Ali Mahamane Lamine Zeine
Minister of Agricultural Development: Ahaman Moussa
Minister of Youth and Sports: TBA
Minister of Urbanisation, Housing and Land Registry: Aissa Diallo Abdoulaye
Minister of Mines and Energy: Mohamed Abdoulahi
Minister of Secondary and Higher Education, and Technology and Research: Sidikou Oumarou
Minister of Communication, Spokesman of the Government: Mohamed Ben Omar
Minister of the Civil Service and Labour: Kanda Siptey
Minister of Culture, Arts and Leisure, in charge of the promotion of art-based entrepreneurship: Oumarou Hadary
Minister of the Population and Social Reforms: TBA
Minister of National Education: Ousmane Samba Mamadou
Minister in Charge of Relations with State Institutions: Salifou Madou Kelzou
Minister of the Environment and the fight against Desertification: Issoufou Bako
Minister of National Competitiveness and the fight against the High Cost of Life: TBA
Minister of Religious Affairs and Humanitarian Actions: Labo Issaka
Minister of Equipment: Lamido Moumouni Harouna
Minister of Trade, Industry and Normalization: Halidou Badje
Minister of National Defense: Djida Hamadou (CDS-Rahama) 
Minister of Justice, Attorney General: Garba Lompo
Minister of Transport and Civil Aviation:Colonel Issa Mazou
Minister of Tourism and Handicrafts: Sani Morou Fatouma
Minister of Land Development and Community Development: Sadé Souley
Minister of Public Health: TBA
Minister of Animal Resources: TBA
Minister for the Promotion of the Young Entrepreneurs and the Reform of Public Companies: TBA
Minister of Vocational and Technical Training: Dagra Mamadou
Minister of Population, Women’s Promotion and the Protection of Children: Maikibi Kadiatou Dandobi            
Minister of African Integration and Nationals living abroad: TBA
Minister of Water Resources: TBA

References

"Niger : President Mamadou Tandja approves new govt.", African Press Agency, June 9, 2007.
List of governments of Niger: January 2000 - April 2007, izf.net/AFP.  Retrieved 2009-02-16.
List of Government of Niger.  United States Central Intelligence Agency.  Current as of 18 June 2009.  Accessed: 2009-06-29.

Ministers
Nigerien ministers
Ministers